Skylab Radio is a British digital radio station, specialising in various forms of chillout music, including downtempo, lounge, triphop, balearic beat and ambient music. The radio station broadcasts worldwide, via TuneIn, Radio Garden and iTunes, as well as DAB+ Digital Radio in the Norwich and Black Country areas of England. Skylab Radio is owned and operated by Skylab Radio Limited, a private company limited by guarantee registered in Coventry, West Midlands.

Background
The name 'Skylab Radio' was first used in 2009, during internet radio tests on behalf of a community radio station in Lancashire. In December 2011; Skylab Radio recommenced as an internet radio station, initially utilising the Live365 network, but later moved onto the Shoutcast platform. They were also included within the iTunes, Wunder Radio, Pure Lounge and TuneIn internet radio directories. The station was inspired by the original 'Chill' digital radio station, Jazz FM's HedKandi:The Broadcast and Claire Anderson's Late Lounge, along with The Big Chill. Although the station is cloud-based, with no physical studio presence; Skylab Radio has been connected with the North West and West Midlands regions of England since its origins. Skylab Radio is named after the NASA Space Stations called Skylab, which signified an example of 'experimentation and innovation'.

Playlist
Skylab Radio is a music-driven radio station playing chillout, lounge, ambient, downtempo and soft house music, whose output consists primarily of non-stop music, interspersed with voiced announcements and identification. Alexander Copley, writing for digital radio manufacturer Pure's blog described Skylab Radio as "like the musical equivalent of a comforting cup of herbal tea, de-stress and embrace your creativity with an eclectic playlist that covers chillout, lounge, downtempo, ambient and Balearic beats." Chillout music has no exact definition, according to Jody Rosen writing for Slate Magazine, suggesting "chillout may well be the most elastic category of them all, encompassing virtually any moderately laid-back music you can name." However Skylab Radio's playlist consists of artists who are primarily associated with chillout, downtempo, balearic beat, or triphop for instance, alongside contemporary artists who are known within other musical genres. The core artists played on Skylab Radio include; 4hero, Air, Aphex Twin, Blank & Jones, Boards of Canada, Brian Eno, Chicane, Chris Coco, Cocteau Twins, deadmau5, DJ Shadow, Goldfrapp, Groove Armada, I Am Kloot, José Padilla, Kaskade, Late Night Alumni, Massive Attack, Moby, Nick Drake, Nightmares on Wax, Nitin Sawhney, Nouvelle Vague, Ólafur Arnalds, Portishead, Rae & Christian, Röyksopp, Sia, The Orb, Thievery Corporation, Tricky and Zero 7. According to Online Radiobox; Skylab Radio's music policy also incorporates a significant number of unsigned and self-publishing producers. However this has a direct correlation with Katy Jay's programming on Skylab Radio, which has encouraged considerable input from independent artists.

The radio station initially gained a following due to the unconventional use of 1970s and 1980s MOR or soft rock format radio jingles, despite playing no music from either format. JAM Creative Productions and TM Studios of Dallas, United States reproduced some of their back-catalogue jingles for Skylab Radio, which were re-sung to reflect the stations contemporary straplines and positioning statements. Another important aspect of Skylab Radio's on-air identity is the use of a single station voice providing a cohesion between the various programming elements.

DAB Digital Radio
In April 2017; Skylab Radio started contributing regular programming to Folder Media's new DAB digital radio station, Upload Radio, whose purpose was to broadcast user generated programming. Following the closure of Upload Radio in June 2018; Skylab Radio obtained a Digital Sound Programme (DSP) Licence from Ofcom, after confirmation of carriage on Angel Radio's 'Solent Wireless' multiplex. This multiplex serves Portsmouth and the surrounding areas of Hampshire, and was initially established as part of Ofcom's 'Small-Scale DAB' trials. The radio station commenced broadcasting on the Portsmouth 'Small-Scale DAB' multiplex on 9 August 2018, utilising the DAB+ audio standard. Skylab Radio was also added onto the Future Radio Norfolk small-scale trial DAB multiplex in Norwich on 26 January 2019, again utilising the DAB+ audio standard. Skylab Radio's owner was cited by Ofcom, crediting small-scale DAB with an overall growth in listeners. Inclusion on the Portsmouth multiplex was a good decision as far as we were concerned, we noticed that listenership and overall interest in Skylab increased. The prospective radio station bouquet for the new Small Scale DAB digital radio multiplex for Dudley and Stourbridge, West Midlands, includes Skylab Radio. This new multiplex commenced broadcasting on 29 October 2022. Skylab Radio also commenced broadcasting on the 'Niocast Digital' Trial multiplex in Manchester, for a limited period from 09 March 2023.

Programming
Much of Skylab Radio's output is automated, with regular voiced announcements by Neal Bowden, Katy Jay and Ann Marie Walsh. However, the station has introduced monthly presenter-led late-night programming from Thursday to Monday.

See also
 Digital radio in the United Kingdom
 List of Internet radio stations
 List of radio stations in the United Kingdom
 Radio in the United Kingdom

References

External links
 Station website
 Media.Info Skylab Radio Profile
 Skylab Radio Mixcloud Profile
Skylab Radio Showreel

Radio stations in Hampshire
Radio stations in Norfolk
Radio stations in the West Midlands (region)